Central link may refer to:

 Central Link, now known as the 1 Line, a light rail line running between the cities of Seattle and SeaTac, part of Sound Transit's Link light rail system
 North–South Expressway Central Link, the main expressway in Malaysia
 Sha Tin to Central Link, a heavy rail expansion project of the MTR in Hong Kong

See also
 Central Artery, a section of freeway in downtown Boston, Massachusetts
 Central subway (disambiguation)
 Central line (disambiguation)